Baldomero Sanín Cano (27 June 1861 in Rionegro, Antioquia – 12  May 1957 in Bogotá) was a Colombian essayist, journalist, linguist, humanist and university professor.

He graduated as a teacher in the Normal de Rionegro, in the department of Antioquia, and became undersecretary of the Reyes administration and ambassador of Colombia in England. He was a collaborator of the Hispania magazine and an editor of the newspaper La Nación of Buenos Aires. He served as a minister in Argentina  1934. He was a member of the Academia Colombiana de la Lengua. He was also Rector of the University of El Cauca in Popayan and also collaborator of El Tiempo in Bogota.

Works
La administración Reyes 1904–1909 (1909)
Colombia hace sesenta años (1888)
An elementary Spanish grammar (1918)
La civilización manual y otros ensayos (1925)
Indagaciones e imágenes (1926)
Manual de historia de la literatura española (1926)
Crítica y arte (1932)
Divagaciones filológicas y apólogos literarios (1934)
Ensayos (1942)
De mi vida y otras vidas (1949)
El humanismo y el progreso del hombre (1955)
Pesadumbre de la belleza y otros cuentos y apólogos (1957)
Letras colombianas (1984).

External links
 
Biography

1861 births
1957 deaths
People from Rionegro
Colombian male writers
Colombian essayists
Colombian journalists
Linguists from Colombia
Male journalists
Male essayists
Stalin Peace Prize recipients